Didem Ege (born 31 May 1988) is a Turkish volleyball player. She is 173 cm and plays as libero. She plays for Turkish professional club Fenerbahçe Universal.

She started her professional career with Enka Spor where she played for 2 years then transferred to Eczacıbaşı Vitra where she played 5 years. Then she moved to United States to study Psychology in Clemson University After her university career she moved back to Turkey and played for Nilufer Belediyesi in 2010-11 season.

See also
 Turkish women in sports

References

External links
 
 Didem Ege at WorldofVolley.com

1988 births
Living people
Turkish women's volleyball players
Clemson University alumni
Eczacıbaşı volleyball players
Fenerbahçe volleyballers
21st-century Turkish sportswomen